Baie Verte is a community in Westmorland County in the Canadian province of New Brunswick.

Of French origin: "...from the salt water grasses which in the summer make the bay look like an immense meadow" (Ganong).  Variations:  Franquelin, 1686-Baye Verte; Moll, 1715-Green Bay; Haliburton, 1829-Bay Verte.

The community is situated near the Confederation Bridge to Prince Edward Island and is surrounded by a large area of salt marsh with much wildlife including birds, deer and skunks. It is home to the Winegarden Estate vineyard and the Waterfowl Village.

The local service district of Baie-Verte takes its name from the community but with slight difference in spelling.

History

Notable people

See also
List of communities in New Brunswick

References

Communities in Westmorland County, New Brunswick
Designated places in New Brunswick
Local service districts of Westmorland County, New Brunswick